Spiralinella is a genus of very small sea snails, pyramidellid gastropod mollusks, or micromollusks.

Nomenclature
Both this genus and its type species have had a very complicated synonymy. The status of the generic name Spiralinella in contrast to the names Partulida and Spiralina was clarified by Corgan (1973), and the nomenclatorical problems around the type species were discussed by van Aartsen & Gianuzzi-Savelli (1991).

Life habits
Little is known about the biology of the members of this genus. As is true of most members of the Pyramidellidae sensu lato, they are most likely to be ectoparasites.

Species
Species within the genus Spiralinella include:
 Spiralinella incerta (Milaschewich, 1916)
 Spiralinella marthinae (Nofroni & Schander, 1994)
 Spiralinella muinaiensis Saurin, 1962
 Spiralinella spiralis (Montagu, 1803) (Type species) (as Turbo spiralis)

References

External links 
 Spiralinella  pellucida illustration of type species

Pyramidellidae